is a 1973 Japanese adult animated art film produced by the animation studio Mushi Production and distributed by Nippon Herald Films. It is the third and final entry in Mushi Production's adult-oriented Animerama trilogy, following A Thousand and One Nights (1969) and Cleopatra (1970). Its initial release was a commercial failure and caused the studio to go bankrupt. The film was remastered in 2016 by Cinelicious Pics and has received generally favorable reviews from contemporary film critics.

It follows the story of Jeanne, a peasant woman who makes a faustian deal with the devil after she is raped by the local nobility on the night of her wedding day. It is notable for its erotic, violent, and psychedelic imagery and considered a cult film.

Plot
Jeanne and Jean are newlyweds in a rural village in medieval France. But on Jeanne's wedding night, she is brutally gang-raped in a ritual deflowering by the local baron and his courtiers. She returns to Jean terrified, and he attempts to calm her by saying they can start over from that moment. Shortly after they embrace, however, Jean strangles Jeanne to a state of unconsciousness. Ashamed, he flees outside their home.

That night, Jeanne begins to see visions of a phallic-headed spirit who promises her power. The spirit tells her it heard her calling for help, and that it can grow as big and powerful as she wants it to. As a result, the couple's fortunes rise even as famine strikes the village, and the baron raises taxes to fund his war effort. Formerly exhausted by his life of menial labor, Jean is elevated to the role of tax collector. But the baron cuts off Jean's hand as punishment when he could not extract enough money from the village, leaving him miserable and drunk.

The spirit visits Jeanne once again (having grown in size) and rapes her in exchange for more riches. Although she submits her body, she attests that her soul still belongs to Jean and to God. Shortly after, Jeanne takes out a large loan from a usurer and sets herself up in the same trade, eventually becoming the true power in the village. The baron returns victorious from his war, and his wife, envious of the respect and admiration Jeanne received, calls her a witch and turns the villagers against her. Running from the mob, Jeanne tries to return home to Jean, but he refuses to open the door and she is assaulted.

That evening, when soldiers come to arrest her, she flees into the nearby forest. In the wilderness, she finally makes a pact with the spirit, who reveals himself to be the Devil. She is granted magical powers, and returns to find the village has been infected with the bubonic plague. Jeanne uses her powers to create a cure for the disease, and the village flocks to her for aid. Having won their favor, Jeanne presides over orgiastic rites among the villagers.

A page, who falls in love with the baron's wife, begs Jeanne to help him seduce her. She gives him a love potion that causes the baron's wife to accept his advances, but the baron catches his wife sleeping with the page and kills them both. Perturbed by Jeanne's power, the baron sends Jean to invite her to a meeting. The couple reconciled, and Jeanne accepts the invitation. In exchange for sharing her cure for the plague, the baron offers to make Jeanne the second-highest noble in the land, but she refuses, saying she wishes to take over the entire world.

Angered at her refusal, the baron orders Jeanne burnt at the stake. Jean is killed by the baron's soldiers when he tries to retaliate, which angers the villagers. As Jeanne is burned, the faces of the villagers transform into Jeanne's, fulfilling a priest's warning that if a witch is burnt while her pride is intact, the evil in her soul will survive and spread to influence everyone around her. Centuries later, the influence of Jeanne's spirit initiates The French Revolution.

Cast
 Aiko Nagayama as Jeanne
 Katsutaka Ito as Jean
 Tatsuya Nakadai as the Devil
 Masaya Takahashi as Milord
 Shigako Shimegi as Milady
 Masakane Yonekura as Catholic Priest
 Chinatsu Nakayama as Narrator

Production and release

Directed and co-written by Eiichi Yamamoto and inspired by Jules Michelet's 1862 non-fiction book La Sorcière. It is the only film in the Animerama trilogy to have been neither written or co-directed by Osamu Tezuka (he left during the film's early stages in 1971 to concentrate on his manga, and his conceptual-stage contribution is uncredited). Belladonna is also of a more serious tone than the more comedic first two Animerama films. According to Jason DeMarco of Paste Magazine, its visuals consist mostly of still paintings panned across "with occasional expressive bursts of color and movement scattered throughout". Jasper Sharp of Midnight Eye also observed that its visuals, designed by illustrator Kuni Fukai, resemble modernist and Art Nouveau painters such as Gustav Klimt, Odilon Redon, Alphonse Mucha, Egon Schiele and Félicien Rops. Production of the film lasted from 1967 to 1973. The film was a commercial failure and contributed to Mushi Pro going bankrupt by the end of the year. The film was entered into the 23rd Berlin International Film Festival.

The film had general releases in some mainland European countries as well as Japan, and some one-off screenings the United States, including in 2009, and underwent a 4K digital restoration for theatrical release in May 2016. Hat & Beard Press on August 26, 2016, released a companion book containing illustrations, script outtakes, film stills and staff interviews.

The restoration was screened on July 10, 2015, in a preview at Japan Cuts, and then played on September 24 at Fantastic Fest in Austin before a theatrical run beginning May 6, 2016, in New York City and San Francisco.

Because of the film's obscurity, various sources list its running time as anywhere from 86 to 93 minutes. Cinelicious Pics clarified in May 2016 that its 86-minute restoration represented the correct running time, saying that this length had been cut down by approximately eight minutes for an unsuccessful re-release in Japan in 1979 (with the addition of the brief ending shot of Eugène Delacroix's painting Liberty Leading the People, which was not in the original version, but Cinelicious left it in the restored version). Cinelicious restored the censored footage from the sole surviving 35 mm release print of the full-length version at the Cinematek in Belgium, which agreed to do a 4K scan of the missing sections from their print.

Reception
Belladonna of Sadness holds a 90% approval rating on the review aggregator website Rotten Tomatoes based on 41 reviews, with an average rating of 7.80/10. The site's critical consensus reads: "Belladonna of Sadness has more than enough brilliant visual artistry to keep audiences enraptured even as the film's narrative reach slightly exceeds its grasp". On Metacritic, the film has a weighted average score of 70 out of 100 based on 12 critic reviews, indicating "generally favorable reviews".

In 2016, Charles Solomon of the Los Angeles Times reviewed the film, calling it dated by today's standards, saying that it "looks exploitative and misogynistic 43 years later".

See also
 List of animated feature-length films

Footnotes

References

External links
 
 
 
 
 

1973 anime films
Japanese adult animated films
Japanese animated feature films
Films about sexuality
Films based on non-fiction books
Films directed by Eiichi Yamamoto
Osamu Tezuka anime
Mushi Production
Japanese animated films
Films about witchcraft
Animated films about revenge